Qaleh-ye Aqa (also Romanized as Qal‘eh-ye Āqā; also known as Qal‘eh-ye Āqā ‘Abdollāh) is a village in Kharqan Rural District, Bastam District, Shahrud County, Semnan Province, Iran. At the 2006 census, its population was 1,045, in 285 families.

References 

Populated places in Shahrud County